The 1000s BC is a decade which lasted from 1009 BC to 1000 BC.

Events and trends
 1006 BC—David becomes king of the ancient United Kingdom of Israel (traditional date). (according to the bible and torah only, no real historical evidence)
 Earliest evidence of farming in the Kenya highlands.
 c. 1000 BC—Iron Age starts.
 c. 1000 BC—The United Kingdom of Israel reaches its largest size, it is Israel's golden age. (according to the bible and torah only, no real historical evidence)  
 c. 1000 BC—Nok culture in Nigeria.
 c. 1000 BC—Latins come to Italy from the Danube region.
 c. 1000 BC—Archaeological evidence obtained from inscriptions excavated in 2005 dates the Proto-Dravidian language, a classical language spoken in India.
 c. 1000 BC—Assyrians started to conquer neighbouring regions.
 1000 BC—World population: 50,000,000
 1000 BC—Priene, Western Anatolia is founded.
 c. 1000 BC—Hungarian separates from its closest linguistic relatives, the Ob-Ugric languages.
 c. 1000 BC—Ancient Iranian peoples enter Persia.
 c. 1000 BC—Villanovans occupy the northern and western Italy.
 c. 1000 BC—Phoenician alphabet is invented.
 c. 1000 BC—Rice is cultivated in Ancient Japan.
 1000 BC—Early Horizon period starts in the Andes.
 c. 1000 BC—Chavin culture starts in the Andes.
 c. 1000 BC—Paracas culture starts in the Andes.
 c. 1000 BC—Historical beginning of the peoples we later know as Illyrians
 c. 1000 BC—Rough carbon-14 dating of the Cherchen Man.

Significant people
 Saul, king of Israel (1037 BC-1010 BC) (according to the bible and torah only, no real historical evidence)
 David, king of the ancient Israelites (1006 BC–965 BC) (according to the bible and torah only, no real historical evidence)
 Solomon, also king of Israel (according to the bible and torah only, no real historical evidence)
 Zoroaster, ancient Iranian prophet (approximate date, estimates range from 1000 BC to 600 BC)

References